Nic, Nicholas or Nick Johnson may refer to:

Sports
Nic Johnson (born 1983), American rugby player
Nick Johnson (baseball) (born 1978), American baseball player
Nick Johnson (basketball) (born 1992), American basketball player
Nick Johnson (ice hockey, born 1985), Canadian ice hockey player
Nick Johnson (ice hockey, born 1986), American ice hockey player
Nick Johnson (rugby league), English rugby player

Others
Nicholas Johnson (sculptor) (died 1624), English church monument maker
Nicholas Johnson (Paymaster of the Forces) (died 1682), English royal administrator,
Nicholas Johnson (born 1934), American law professor, Federal Communications Commission commissioner 1966-73
Nicholas Johnson (dancer), principal dancer with The Royal Ballet
Nik Johnson, British politician

See also
Nick Johnston (disambiguation)
Niclas Jönsson, Swedish racing driver
Niklas Jonsson, Swedish cross country skier